The Roman Catholic Archdiocese of Paraíba is a Latin Metropolitan archdiocese, named after the city of João Pessoa, which used to be named Paraíba, in southeastern Brazil.

Its cathedral archiepiscopal see is a minor basilica, the Cathedral Basilica of Our Lady of the Snows (Catedral Basílica Metropolitana Nossa Senhora das Neves), in the city of João Pessoa, the state capital.

History 
 Established on April 27, 1892 as Diocese of Paraiba, on territory split off from the then Diocese of Olinda
 Lost territory on 1909.12.29 to establish the then Diocese of Natal (now Metropolitan itself)
 Promoted on February 6, 1914 as Metropolitan Archdiocese of Paraíba, having lost territory to establish its senior suffragan, the Diocese of Cajazeiras
 Lost territory twice again to establish more suffragan sees : on 1949.05.14 the Diocese of Campina Grande and on 1980.10.11 the Diocese of Guarabira.

Statistics 
As per 2014, it pastorally served 1,288,000 Catholics (82.8% of 1,556,103 total) on 6,703 km² in 89 parishes and 8 missions with 151 priests (116 diocesan, 35 religious), 37 deacons, 259 lay religious (41 brothers, 218 sisters) and 45 seminarians.

Ecclesiastical province 
Its Suffragan sees are :
 Roman Catholic Diocese of Cajazeiras, a daughter 
 Roman Catholic Diocese of Campina Grande, a daughter
 Roman Catholic Diocese of Guarabira, youngest daughter
 Roman Catholic Diocese of Patos

Bishops
(all Roman Rite)

Episcopal ordinaries

 Suffragan Bishops of Paraíba  
 Bishop Adauctus Aurélio de Miranda Henriques (1894.01.02 – 1914.02.06 see below)

Metropolitan Archbishops of Paraíba 
 Adauctus Aurélio de Miranda Henriques (see above 1914.02.06 – death 1935.08.15)
 Moisés Ferreira Coelho (1935.08.16 – death 1959.04.18), previously Bishop of Cajazeiras (Brazil) (1914.11.16 – 1932.02.12), then Titular Archbishop of Berœa (1932.02.12 – 1935.08.16) as Coadjutor Archbishop of Paraíba (1932.02.12 – succession 1935.08.16)
 Auxiliary Bishop: Manuel Pereira da Costa (1954.05.31 – 1959.06.20), Titular Bishop of Knin (1954.05.31 – 1959.06.20); later Bishop of Nazaré (Brazil) (1959.06.20 – 1962.08.23), Bishop of Campina Grande (Brazil) (1962.08.23 – retired 1981.05.20), died 2006
 Mário de Miranda Villas-Boas (1959.06.20 – retired 1965.05.18), emeritate as Titular Archbishop of Gibba (1965.05.18 – death 1968.02.23); previously Bishop of Garanhuns (Brazil) (1938.05.26 – 1944.09.10), Metropolitan Archbishop of Belém do Pará (Brazil) (1944.09.10 – 1956.10.23), Titular Archbishop of Cyrrhus (1956.10.23 – 1959.06.20) as never succeeding Coadjutor Archbishop of São Salvador da Bahia (Brazil) (1956.10.23 – 1959.06.20)
 José Maria Pires (1965.12.02 – retired 1995.11.29); previously Bishop of Araçuaí (Brazil) (1957.05.25 – 1965.12.02)
 Marcelo Pinto Carvalheira (1995.11.29 – retired 2004.05.05), also Vice-President of National Conference of Bishops of Brazil (1998 – 2003); previously Titular Bishop of Bitylius (1975.10.29 – 1981.11.09) as Auxiliary Bishop of Paraíba (1975.10.29 – 1981.11.09), Bishop of Guarabira (Brazil) (1981.11.09 – 1995.11.29)
 Aldo de Cillo Pagotto, Congregation of the Blessed Sacrament (S.S.S.) (2004.05.05 – retired 2016.07.06), previously Coadjutor Bishop of Sobral (Brazil) (1997.09.10 – 1998.03.18) succeeding as Bishop of Sobral (1998.03.18 – 2004.05.05)
'' Apostolic Administrator Genival Saraiva de França  (2016.07.06 – 2017.03.08), former Bishop of Palmares (Brazil) (2000.07.12 – 2014.03.19)
 Manoel Delson Pedreira da Cruz, Capuchin Franciscans (O.F.M. Cap.) (2017.03.08 – ...), previously Bishop of Caicó (Brazil) (2006.07.05 – 2012.08.08), Bishop of Campina Grande (Brazil) (2012.08.08 – 2017.03.08).

Coadjutor archbishop
Moisés Sizenando Coelho (1932-1935)

Auxiliary bishops
Manuel Pereira da Costa (1954-1959), appointed Bishop of Nazaré, Pernambuco 
Marcelo Pinto Carvalheira (1975-1981), appointed Archbishop here

See also 
 List of Catholic dioceses in Brazil

Sources and external links 

 GCatholic.org, with Google map and satellite photo - data for all sections
 Catholic Hierarchy
  Archdiocese website (Portuguese)

Roman Catholic dioceses in Brazil
Roman Catholic ecclesiastical provinces in Brazil
 
Religious organizations established in 1892
Roman Catholic dioceses and prelatures established in the 19th century